The 1987 English cricket season was the 88th in which the County Championship had been an official competition. Nottinghamshire achieved a Championship and NatWest Trophy "double". John Player ended their sponsorship of the Sunday League after an eighteen-year spell and the competition sponsorship was taken over by Refuge Assurance. Pakistan defeated England in the Test series with one win and four draws.

Honours
County Championship - Nottinghamshire
NatWest Trophy - Nottinghamshire
Sunday League - Worcestershire
Benson & Hedges Cup - Yorkshire
Minor Counties Championship - Buckinghamshire
MCCA Knockout Trophy - Cheshire
Second XI Championship - Kent II, Yorkshire II (shared title) 
Wisden - Jonathan Agnew, Neil Foster, David Hughes, Peter Roebuck, Saleem Malik

Test series

County Championship

NatWest Trophy

Benson & Hedges Cup

Sunday League

Leading batsmen

Leading bowlers

References

External sources
 CricketArchive – season and tournament itineraries

Annual reviews
 Playfair Cricket Annual 1988
 Wisden Cricketers' Almanack 1988

English cricket seasons in the 20th century
English Cricket Season, 1987
Cricket season